Newspapers and news media in the United States traditionally endorse candidates for party nomination for President of the United States, prior to endorsing one of the ultimate nominees for president. Below is a list of notable news media endorsements in 2016, by candidate, for each primary race.

Democrats

Hillary Clinton (nominee)

Bernie Sanders

Republicans

Jeb Bush

Ben Carson

Chris Christie

Ted Cruz

John Kasich

Ronald Reagan (write-in)
Although Reagan died in 2004, one newspaper recommended a write-in vote for him to protest against Donald Trump.

Marco Rubio

Donald Trump (nominee)

See also
 Newspaper endorsements in the United States presidential election, 2016

References

2016 United States presidential election endorsements
Newspaper endorsements
2016 in mass media